Staunton station is an Amtrak train station in Staunton, Virginia, located in the downtown Wharf Area Historic District of the city. It is served by Amtrak's Cardinal, which runs between New York and Chicago.

The station has restrooms and benches, but no ticket office. With limited intercity bus service in Staunton, a Virginia Breeze stop two miles distant, the station serves a large area of the Shenandoah Valley for rail service.

Next to the station are restaurants and art studios, as well as other points of interest. For pedestrians, the historic Sears Hill Bridge and paved trail lead to the Sears Hill neighborhood and the Sears House in Woodrow Wilson Park. The 1905 steel truss bridge was restored 2010-2016, by community fundraising and the city.  Next to the station is a Chessie System caboose.

The site of the station has been a railroad depot since 1854:

 The third and existing station building was designed by Staunton architect Thomas Jasper Collins and built by the Chesapeake and Ohio Railway in 1902.

The current station facility is the former telegraph tower from when the Staunton station functioned as a full passenger and freight railroad depot.  While the platform still functions as the railroad platform for loading and unloading passengers, the former station passenger and freight buildings are now occupied by a reception hall for events, replacing a restaurant.

See also 
American Hotel (Staunton, Virginia)

References

External links 

Brite Downtown Trolley
Virginia Breeze intercity bus
Staunton Amtrak Station – (USA Rail Guide - Train Web)
"Area Overview: History: Railroads", The News Leader.  Retrieved on 2008-04-13.

Buildings and structures in Staunton, Virginia
Amtrak stations in Virginia
Stations along Chesapeake and Ohio Railway lines